The Regius Chair of Clinical Surgery is a royal professorship in the University of Edinburgh, Scotland. It was established by George III in 1802 in the university's Faculty of Medicine.

Regius Professors of Clinical Surgery 
 Professor James Russell (1802)
 Professor James Syme (1833)
 Lord Joseph Lister (1869)
 Professor Thomas Annandale (1877)
 Professor Francis Mitchell Caird (1908)
 Sir Harold Stiles (1919)
 Sir John Fraser (1927)
 Sir James Learmonth (1946)
 Sir John Bruce (1956)
 Sir Patrick Forrest (1971)
 Sir David Carter (1988)
 Professor O. James Garden (2000)
Professor Stephen Wigmore (2019)

References 

Professorships at the University of Edinburgh
1802 establishments in Scotland
Clinical Surgery
Professorships in medicine